Dead of Night is a 1977 American made-for-television anthology horror film starring Ed Begley Jr., Anjanette Comer, Patrick Macnee, Horst Buchholz and Joan Hackett. Directed by Dan Curtis, the film consists of three stories written by Richard Matheson (although the first segment, "Second Chance", was adapted from a story by Jack Finney) much like the earlier Trilogy of Terror. The film originally premiered on NBC on March 29, 1977.

Plot

"Second Chance"
The first segment features Ed Begley Jr. as a man who restores a 1926 roadster and finds himself transported back in time.

Cast
Ed Begley Jr. as Frank
E. J. André as Mr. McCauley
Ann Doran as Mrs. McCauley
Christina Hart as Helen

"No Such Thing as a Vampire"
The second segment features Anjanette Comer as a woman who seems to be actively terrorized by a vampire. Patrick Macnee plays her husband who attempts to deal with her terror by engaging the services of a friend, Michael (Horst Buchholz).

Cast
Patrick Macnee as Dr. Gheria
Anjanette Comer as Alexis
Elisha Cook Jr. as Karel
Horst Buchholz as Michael

"Bobby"
The third and final segment deals with the grieving feelings of a mother (Joan Hackett) for her drowned son, Bobby (Lee H. Montgomery) and the lengths she will go to see him again. This story, an original script written for Dead of Night, was later remade for the Dan Curtis omnibus movie Trilogy of Terror II with different actors.

Cast
Joan Hackett as Mother
Lee H. Montgomery as Bobby

Home video
Dead of Night was released on DVD by Dark Sky Films in 2009. The DVD includes a 1969 TV episode, "A Darkness at Blaisedon" written by Dan Curtis and Sam Hall and directed by Lela Swift, which was the pilot for a Dead of Night television series that was never picked up.

References

External links 
 

1977 films
1977 horror films
1977 television films
1970s fantasy films
1970s supernatural horror films
American horror anthology films
American horror television films
American supernatural horror films
Films based on short fiction
Films based on works by Richard Matheson
Films directed by Dan Curtis
Films with screenplays by Richard Matheson
Films set in Illinois
NBC network original films
1970s American films

American vampire films